Acrotome hispida is a species of flowering plant in the family Lamiaceae. This species is native to South Africa. Acrotome hispida was first published in 1848.

Habitat
Acrotome hispida mostly grows in dry tropical biomes, usually depending on the season.

References

Lamiaceae
Flora of South Africa
Taxa named by George Bentham
Plants described in 1848